William Sinclair Kingan (6 December 1876 – 1946) was a unionist politician in Northern Ireland.

Kingan studied at Sunningdale School and Rugby School before working as a pork manufacturer.  In 1924, he served as High Sheriff of Down.

He joined the Ulster Unionist Party, and was elected to the Senate of Northern Ireland in 1940, serving until his death in 1946.  Most notably, he served as a Deputy Speaker of the Senate in 1945.

References

1876 births
1946 deaths
High Sheriffs of Down
Members of the Senate of Northern Ireland 1937–1941
Members of the Senate of Northern Ireland 1941–1945
Members of the Senate of Northern Ireland 1945–1949
Ulster Unionist Party members of the Senate of Northern Ireland
People educated at Sunningdale School
People educated at Rugby School